Battlefield Vietnam is a first-person shooter video game. It is the second installment in the Battlefield franchise, coming after Battlefield 1942. The game was developed by a Canadian company DICE Canada and published by Electronic Arts. Battlefield Vietnam takes place during the Vietnam War and features a large variety of maps based on historical settings, such as the Ho Chi Minh Trail, Battle of Huế, Ia Drang Valley, Operation Flaming Dart, the Battle of Khe Sanh and Fall of Saigon. On 15 March 2005, EA re-released the game as Battlefield Vietnam: Redux, which includes new vehicles, maps and an EA-produced World War II mod, based on the previous installment Battlefield 1942.

Gameplay

In the game's playable maps, the player's primary objective is to occupy Control Points to enable allies and controllable vehicles to spawn. Battlefield Vietnam employs a similar point-by-point objectives to its prequel, Battlefield 1942, and a form of asymmetrical warfare gameplay. The two teams, the U.S. and North Vietnam, are provided different equipment and vehicles. The U.S. relies on heavy vehicles, employing heavy tanks, helicopters, and bombers. The Vietnamese rely on infantry tactics, utilizing anti-tank weapons. The developers intended to reflect the actual conditions of war throughout the game. The game features a "Sipi Hole" as a mobile spawn point. This element is representative of the vast tunnel networks utilized by Vietnam forces.  Similar to previous games in the Battlefield series, spawn tickets (reinforcements) play a vital role in defeating the opposing team. 

Battlefield Vietnam features the United States with Marines, Army and the Navy; South Vietnam with Army of the Republic of Vietnam; and North Vietnam with People's Army of Vietnam and the Viet Cong.

Built on a modified version of the Battlefield 1942 engine, Battlefield Vietnam has new and improved features compared to its predecessor. The game gives the player a variety of weapons based on the war. The game features various contemporary weapons and concepts, such as the AK47 assault rifle and punji stick traps. The game introduced several vehicle improvements over the prequel, such as air-lifting vehicles and working vehicle radios. The radios feature 1960s music and an option for the player to import their own audio files into a designated directory. Unlike the prequel, players are able to fire their weapons from vehicles when in the passenger seat of a vehicle. The game is the first in the Battlefield series to utilize a 3D map, allowing players to see icons that represent the position of control points or friendly units, giving the player an increased situational awareness.

Reception

In June 2004, Battlefield Vietnam received a "Gold" certification from the Verband der Unterhaltungssoftware Deutschland, indicating sales of at least 100,000 units across Germany, Switzerland and Austria. Overall sales of Battlefield Vietnam reached 990,000 copies by that November, by which time the Battlefield series had sold 4.4 million copies.

The game received "generally favorable reviews" according to the review aggregation website Metacritic.

Battlefield Vietnam was a runner-up for Computer Games Magazines list of the 10 best computer games of 2004. It won the magazine's special award for "Best Soundtrack". It also won GameSpot's 2004 "Best Licensed Music" award.

References

External links

2004 video games
Asymmetrical multiplayer video games
 02
Cold War video games
Electronic Arts games
First-person shooter multiplayer online games
Inactive multiplayer online games
Multiplayer and single-player video games
Multiplayer online games
Video games about the United States Marine Corps
Video games developed in Sweden
Video games set in the 1960s
Video games set in the 1970s
Video games set in Cambodia
Video games set in Vietnam
Vietnam War video games
Windows games
Windows-only games